Kim Soo-yeon (born 17 April 1983) is a South Korea football player who plays for Giravanz Kitakyushu.

On 26 March 2011, Kim joined J2 League club Giravanz Kitakyushu.

Career
Kim played for Pohang Steelers between 2006 and 2010 with 9 appearances, scoring one goal. Kim then played on load for Gwangju Sangmu, with 6 appearances and scoring one goal. His position is defender.

References

External links 

1983 births
Living people
South Korean footballers
K League 1 players
J2 League players
Pohang Steelers players
Gimcheon Sangmu FC players
Giravanz Kitakyushu players
Association football defenders